Bembridge was the terminus of the  branch line that connected it to the main line at Brading. On holiday Saturdays the sector table revolved continuously because the station area was too small to contain points.

History
Opened in 1882, when the area contained the Island's main port, it ran with ever-dwindling passengers until 1953. The station is long since demolished and a new development (Harbour Strand) in place.

Stationmasters

William Weeks 1881–1891
Harry Owen Bench 
Walter John Daish 1908– (formerly station master at Ryde St John's)
Martin Stanley

See also 
 List of closed railway stations in Britain

References

External links
 Bembridge on Subterranea Britannica
 Bembridge station on navigable 1946 O. S. map
 Bembridge on Ordnance Survey 25 inch map (1907)

Disused railway stations on the Isle of Wight
Former Isle of Wight Railway stations
Railway stations in Great Britain opened in 1882
Railway stations in Great Britain closed in 1953
Bembridge